Prince Whipple (1750–1796) was an African American slave and later freedman. He was a soldier and a bodyguard during the American Revolution under his enslaver General William Whipple of the New Hampshire Militia who granted him his freedom after the war. Prince is depicted in Emanuel Leutze's painting Washington Crossing the Delaware and Thomas Sully's painting Passage of the Delaware.

Early life 
In his 1855 book Colored Patriots of the American Revolution, the nineteenth-century African-American author and abolitionist William Cooper Nell related some undocumented anecdotes about Whipple and his life:

Prince Whipple was born in Ambou , Africa, of comparatively wealthy parents. When about ten years of age, he was sent by them, in company with a cousin, to America to be educated. An elder brother had returned four years before, and his parents were anxious that their child should receive the same benefits. The captain who brought the two boys over proved to be a treacherous villain, and carried them to Baltimore, where he exposed them for sale, they were both purchased by Portsmouth, New Hampshire men, Prince falling to General William Whipple. He was emancipated during the [Revolutionary] War, was much esteemed, and was once entrusted by the General with a large sum of money to carry from Salem to Portsmouth. He was attacked on the road, near Newburyport, by two ruffians; one was struck with a loaded whip, the other one he shot ... Prince was beloved by all who knew him. He was also known as "Caleb Quotom" of Portsmouth, where he died leaving a widow, Dinah, a freeperson and two children. 

Prince and his brother Cuffee were sent by their parents to study in America. During the journey, they were kidnapped by a slave trader and sent to a prison in the Caribbean. Prince, his brother, and hundreds of other slaves at the prison were sold to a sea captain. A majority of the prisoners were sent to sugar and tobacco plantations in the West Indies and the Southern British Colonies. Prince and Cuffee were not among those sold in the plantations, but instead were sent to Portsmouth, New Hampshire to be house slaves. There they were purchased by William Whipple Jr. who was a successful businessman and owner of the slave ship that purchased the slaves from the prison.

Prince was well liked in Portsmouth. As William Nell stated "He was also known as 'Caleb Quotom" of Portsmouth'" and got along well with the other slaves. Prince joined William as a servant in large weddings, dinners, balls, and parties held by the White population of New Hampshire and was well received.

American Revolution 
When the Revolution started, William Whipple was assigned as a captain in the Continental Army and took Prince with him. Initially, Prince served as a bodyguard to William because of military regulations that forbid Blacks from serving in the army or militia. Despite the restrictions, Blacks had been reported to have fought alongside the colonists in many battles including Lexington and Bunker Hill. The British offered freedom to American slaves if they were to serve in the British Army against the American Colonies. In 1780, the Southern Colonies began to draft free Blacks and a select number of enslaved men for military service as a response to the actions of the British. The conscription of Blacks was also an answer to the diminishing manpower of the Thirteen Colonies. The increased need of men allowed Prince to serve as a military aide to William and a soldier in the New Hampshire Militia.

Service under William Whipple 
In 1777, William was promoted to brigadier general and was ordered to go to Vermont. Prince joined him, but challenged his position as a slave. Prince argued with William saying "You are going to fight for your Liberty, but I have none to fight for." William offered Prince his freedom if he continued his military service. Prince agreed and by the end of the war, William ended Prince's servitude and granted his freedom. According to the Portsmouth, New Hampshire Town Records, General Whipple granted Prince the rights of a freeman on February 22, 1781, Prince's wedding day. He was legally manumitted by Gen. William Whipple on February 26, 1784.

Freedom Petition 

In 1779 Prince joined with nineteen other freed slaves who referred themselves as the "Natives of Africa" in Portsmouth. These men went to the House and Council sitting of New Hampshire and petitioned for their freedom to be kept. They stated the following:
God of Nature gave them Life and Freedom, upon the Terms of the most perfect Equality with other men, That Freedom is an inherent right of the human Species, not to be surrendered, but by Consent, for the Sake of social Life; that private or public Tyranny and Slavery, are alike detestable to Minds conscious of the equal Dignity of human Nature …  
Their plea for freedom was made public in the New Hampshire Gazette. Although Prince was not a freedman at the time of the signing of the petition, he was an advocate for the protection of freedmen rights and liberties.

After the War 
Prince returned to Portsmouth as a freedman and reunited with his brother Cuffee. He married a woman named Dinah who was a slave in New Castle and was granted freedman status by her enslaver at age 21. For his service in the war, Prince was given a small plot of land to which he, his brother, and his wife built a house on that. They converted the house into the Ladies Charitable African School to teach young children. Dinah was its teacher until her death. Prince died in 1796 and is buried in Portsmouth's North Cemetery.

Legacy 
Prince's legacy during the Revolution did not go unnoticed among artists. His service with William and George Washington is depicted in two art pieces.

Washington Crossing the Delaware 
According to legend, Prince Whipple accompanied General Whipple and George Washington in the famous crossing of the Delaware River and is the black man portrayed fending off ice with an oar at Washington's knee in the painting Washington Crossing the Delaware, painted 75 years after the event by German American artist Emanuel Leutze. Most historians doubt that there is any basis for this story. It is extremely unlikely that either General Whipple or Prince Whipple was present at the Battle of Trenton. Moreover, Prince Whipple was not famous at the time the painting was commissioned, and it is unlikely that Leutze would have heard of him.

The Passage of the Delaware 
In 1819, American painter Thomas Sully created his interpretation of the Battle of Trenton. The painting depicts Washington on a white horse around three white officers and a Black man. The Black soldier in the painting is shown wearing red clothing speaking to an officer. The man in this picture is confirmed to be Prince Whipple as Sully had heard about Prince and incorporated him into his painting. Much like the Leutze painting, Prince was most likely not present at Trenton during Washington's crossing.

Footnotes

References

 
 
 
 
 
Robinson, J. Dennis. "Prince Whipple and American Painting", from SeacoastNH.com.
 
Afro-American History thru Art page
Lives of the Signers to the Declaration of Independence. By Rev. Charles A. goodrich, published by William Reed & Co. New York 1829

External links 
Whipple.org
Burial place of Prince Whipple
Seacoast.com page
Prince Whipple 1750-1796
Petition to the New Hampshire Government 1779

African Americans in the American Revolution
American people of Ghanaian descent
18th-century American slaves
People of New Hampshire in the American Revolution
New Hampshire militiamen in the American Revolution
People from Central Region (Ghana)
1796 deaths
1750 births
Black Patriots